The 2018 St Helens Metropolitan Borough Council election took place on 3 May 2018 to elect members of St Helens Metropolitan Borough Council in England. This was on the same day as other local elections. It saw the Green Party get the biggest vote growth, However the only seat change was in Rainhill where an Independent beat Labour. Elsewhere UKIP's Vote share collapsed.

Election Results

Overall election result

Overall result compared with 2016.

Ward Results

Billinge and Seneley Green

Blackbrook

Bold

Earlestown

Eccleston

Haydock

Moss Bank

Newton

Parr

Rainford

Rainhill

Sutton

Thatto Heath

Town Centre

West Park

Windle

References

2018 English local elections
2018
2010s in Merseyside